The 2012–13 season is French football club SC Bastia's 107th professional season, their 47th consecutive season in French top-flight, and their 30th consecutive season in Ligue 1. Bastia is president by Pierre-Marie Geronimi, managed by Frédéric Hantz, and captained by Yannick Cahuzac for the season. Last season; finished as second league champion, and won the first league the right to rise. Bastia, is finished 12th in league, participated in the Coupe de la Ligue for the first time since 2001, reaching the quarter-final before being eliminated by Lille. In the Coupe de France; the "end of 64" tour, eliminated to CA Bastia.

Name of the team's top scorer; including 15 league goals, 17 goals scored by Anthony Modeste. Name of the team league top passer; 8 assist by Jérôme Rothen.

Transfers

In

Out

Squad and statistics 

|-
|colspan="14"|Players who appeared for Bastia no longer at the club:

|}

Current technical staff

Kit
Supplier: KappaSponsor(s): Oscaro, Corsica Ferries, Afflelou*, Géant, Kaporal Jeans*, Haute-Corse General Council, Odalys Vacances*, and Vocalcom*

* In season sponsoring brands
Source: kappa.fr

Friendly matches

Competitions

Ligue 1

League table

Results summary

Results by round

Matches

Coupe de France

Coupe de la Ligue

Statistics

Squad statistics

Notes

References 

SC Bastia seasons
Bastia